Kfarsaroun   in Koura District, in the Northern Governorate of Lebanon. The population are  Greek Orthodox and Maronite.

Notable residents
Fadi Karam (Member of the Lebanese Parliament)

References

External links
Kfar Saroun, Localiban

Eastern Orthodox Christian communities in Lebanon
Maronite Christian communities in Lebanon
Populated places in the North Governorate
Koura District